{|

{{Infobox ship career
|Hide header=
|Ship country=United States
|Ship flag=
|Ship name=*Aphrodite (1899—1930)
Aetos (1930—1933)
Macedonia (1933—1941)
|Ship namesake=Aphrodite, The goddess of love and fertility in Greek mythology
|Ship owner=
|Ship operator=
|Ship registry=*New York, N.Y. (1899—1927)
Piraeus, Greece (1927—1941)
|Ship route=
|Ship ordered=
|Ship awarded=
|Ship builder=Bath Iron Works, Bath, Maine
|Ship original cost=$450,000
|Ship yard number=25
|Ship way number=
|Ship laid down=
|Ship launched=1 December 1898
|Ship sponsor=Miss. Vivien Scott
|Ship christened=
|Ship completed=1899
|Ship acquired=*March 1899 delivery to owner
(Navy) 11 May 1917
|Ship commissioned=(Navy) 5 June 1917—12 July 1919
|Ship recommissioned=
|Ship decommissioned=
|Ship maiden voyage= 
|Ship in service=March 1899
|Ship out of service=April 1941
|Ship renamed=
|Ship reclassified=
|Ship refit=
|Ship struck=
|Ship reinstated=
|Ship homeport=
|Ship identification=*U.S. Official Number: 107440
Signal: KNWF

Aetos signal: JGPQ

Macedonia signal: SVBX

|Ship motto=
|Ship nickname=
|Ship honors=
|Ship fate=Sunk as Macedonia by German aircraft in Gulf of Corinth April 1941
|Ship notes
|Ship badge=
}}

|}Aphrodite was a yacht built to requirements by owner Colonel Oliver H. Payne of New York City as an ocean going steam yacht with barque rig and capable of good speed under sail alone. The yacht was launched 1 December 1898 and completed in 1899 to be the largest American built steam yacht at the time. The yacht served in the United States Navy as the patrol vessel USS Aphrodite from May 1917 to July 1919. The yacht was given the designation SP-135 for Section patrol and was, unlike the majority of section patrol vessels, sent overseas rather than acting in that capacity in home waters. The yacht was returned to private service after the war.

The yacht was sold to Greek owners in 1927 and renamed Aetos in 1930 then, on transfer to the Hellenic Coast Lines, renamed Macedonia in 1933. During the Italian and German invasion of Greece in April 1941 the ship was bombed by German aircraft and sunk.

 Construction Aphrodite was completed for Colonel Oliver H. Payne of New York City as a civilian yacht in 1899 by Bath Iron Works at Bath, Maine. The contract for the yacht was signed in January 1898. Payne had chartered the largest American built steam yacht during 1897 and was impressed by the large seagoing vessel. That yacht, William A. Slater's Eleanor, had been built by Bath Iron Works as hull number 9 with delivery 6 October 1894. Payne developed requirements for a similar and larger yacht and asked the company to submit a design and price for such a vessel. He also requested submissions by other companies, including British yacht builders.

Two requirements reflected his preference for sailing. First the usual large reception rooms in the main deck house were sacrificed for clear deck space with  clearance between the house and rail on each side with a clear view and promenade from stern to bow. The top of the deck house extended over that promenade to the rail providing shelter. Four large ballast tanks were arranged, fore and aft of the machinery space, so that draft and trim could be adjusted suitably for steam or sail combinations. Bath Iron Works submitted the winning design and price for such a yacht capable of crossing the Atlantic at full speed. In 1910 the original masts were replaced by pole masts allowing for a reduction in crew.

Construction of a ship shed in which to build the yacht started a month after the contract was signed. The keel was laid in June with the hull launched and christened Aphrodite by Miss. Vivien Scott, the daughter of the yacht's commander, Captain C. W. Scott on 1 December 1898. Aphrodite was the largest and finest American built steam yacht at the time. The yacht was Bath Iron Works hull number 25 and was assigned U.S. Official Number 107440, signal KNWF. On 10 March 1899 Aphrodite left the shipyard for speed trials with Bath executives, guests and a 25-man crew. Two weeks later the yacht was officially turned over to the owner.

As built specifications include: length overall, including bowsprit , length overall, hull , beam, molded , depth, side, molded , normal cruising draft , loaded draft , gross tonnage Custom House Measurement 1,148. The hull was divided from main deck down by seven watertight steel bulkheads athwart ship and two similar bulkheads extending from lower deck down to divide the vessel into eighteen water tight compartments. The bow flared above the load water line for better comfort in head seas.

Contract speed was 15 knots with trials in a snowstorm producing a mean speed of  including slowdowns and  excluding slowdowns even though hull cementing for best speeds had not been completed. Cabin finishing joiner work, hull cementing were done in New York after the yacht arrived there on 29 March 1899 for interior decoration and final touches. Coal bunkers were sufficient for an Atlantic crossing at a steady 15 knots. Cost of the yacht were $450,000 for construction and about $10,000 per month operating expenses.

 History 

 Yacht Aphrodite Aphrodite was described as a "sea palace" with the design by Bath Iron Works' Charles R. Hanscom merging Payne's requirements for an unusually seaworthy vessel with luxury and beauty. Critics noted the yacht was not as beautiful as some and perhaps not worthy of the name. The yacht had been explicitly designed for ocean cruising rather than coastal entertainment with Payne expressing the desire to sail Aphrodite around Cape Horn.

Despite the absence of a luxurious main saloon usual on such large yachts the yacht was amply arranged for Payne's focus on long distance, ocean cruising. The  deckhouse was steel with mahogany paneling. The main social room was the dining saloon that occupied the forward  of the deckhouse. Two  by  guest rooms with private baths and the owner's  by  quarters with private bath lay aft. The entire starboard length of the deckhouse was connected by an inside passage connecting the spaces. Servants quarters were also located in that area. Above the main deckhouse was a  deckhouse accessible by interior stair with wheel and chart rooms and a smoking room. Chilled provisions for long voyages were kept in separate refrigerated spaces for meat, fowl and fish in the main hold. Electric power was provided by two 110 volt steam powered generating sets.

After a cruise around the world in Aphrodite Payne visited Europe each summer until war restricted his cruising to American waters in 1914. Payne cruised the oceans but apparently laid the yacht up during at least some winters. The yacht is described during the winter of 1900 at Red Hook, Brooklyn's Erie Basin as "covered from stem to stern with an awning of heavy canvas passing over the main boom aft and made fast to the bulwarks all around. Only her bridge, small boats and tall masts are exposed to the weather, and even the boats have substantial covers to protect their interiors" waiting with other yachts for the summer season. After Payne turned the yacht over to the Navy 11 May 1917 under a free lease for war service he never saw the yacht again as he died the next month, 27 June 1917, the day the vessel reached France.

 Navy Service 

The U.S. Navy acquired Aphrodite on 11 May 1917 for use as a patrol vessel during World War I. She was commissioned at New York City on 5 June 1917 as USS Aphrodite (SP-135).

On 14 June 1917 the first convoy carrying elements of the American Expeditionary Force departed for St. Nazaire, France in four groups with Aphrodite among the escort for the second group. She arrived at St. Nazaire on 27 June 1917. on 30 June the vessel was ordered to Brest, France to serve under the senior French naval officer there until arrival of the group's commander, Capt. William B. Fletcher, who would take command of the squadron.Aphrodite in company with Corsair departed St. Nazaire arriving at Brest on 1 July. The armed yacht patrol force was operational on the 14th and began patrolling the Bay of Biscay, escorting coastwise convoys and meeting in-bound convoys from America to see them safely into Brest, Le Verdon-sur-Mer, or St. Nazaire. During these operations Aphrodite picked up survivors of victims of German submarines.  On 16 February 1918, she was reassigned to the base located at Rochefort, France, from which she served as an offshore escort until March 1918. On 28 March 1918, Aphrodite was assigned to Division 7, Squadron 3, Patrol Force, based at Le Verdon-sur-Mer. She served as a convoy escort along the French coast for the remainder of the war.

After the Armistice with Germany of 11 November 1918 ended hostilities, Secretary of the Navy Josephus Daniels wired Vice Adm. Sims that a number of yachts, including Aphrodite were free of their leases and should be returned to the U.S. if practicable. Regardless, on 30 November, Aphrodite was ordered to Harwich, England and served as station ship there and at Portland.

On 10 January 1919 Aphrodite struck an anchored mine while on the way to Germany but on 11 January arrived at Wilhelmshaven, Germany. On the 13th the vessel proceeded to Cuxhaven arriving on the 15th remaining in Germany until returning to Southampton, England on 22 February and moving to Harwich in March, Aphrodite  returned to Germany and served as the station ship at Hamburg.Aphrodite was ordered on 31 May 1919 to return to New York arriving 29 June 1919. She was decommissioned at the Fleet Supply Base at Brooklyn, New York, on 12 July 1919 and returned to her new owner, Harry Payne Whitney who had inherited the majority of his uncle's estate, the same day.

 Post Navy history 
Whitney refitted the yacht, though original fittings and furnishings stripped before naval service had burned in a warehouse fire during the war, and cruised aboard up to 1927.Aphrodite was sold to Apostolos Riggas, Piraeus, Greece in 1927 and in 1930 was renamed Aetos which is shown in the register as being owned by Hellenic Coast Lines, Piraeus. In 1933 the vessel was renamed Macedonia''. The former yacht, with cargo and passengers, was sunk by German aircraft 22 April 1941 at Trizonia in the Gulf of Corinth near Patras, Greece.

Footnotes

References

External links 
Aphrodite private signal, New York Yacht Club
Department of the Navy Naval Historical Center Online Library of Selected Images: U.S. Navy Ships: USS Aphrodite (SP-135), 1917-1919. Originally the Civilian Steam Yacht Aphrodite. (Original NHC site hosted on HyperWar.)
Photo, commercial service after sale to Greek owners.

1898 ships
Ships built in Bath, Maine
Steam yachts
Patrol vessels of the United States Navy
World War I patrol vessels of the United States
Cargo ships of Greece
Maritime incidents in April 1941
Ships sunk by German aircraft